The Federal University of Cariri (in Portuguese: Universidade Federal do Cariri, UFCA) is a Brazilian federal public higher education institution, created in 2013 and based in the city of Juazeiro do Norte, in the state of Ceará. It has campus in the cities of Crato, Barbalha, Brejo Santo and Icó.

The Federal University of Cariri is the result of the dismemberment of the Cariri Campus of the Federal University of Ceará (UFC). Its dismemberment was sanctioned by the law nº 12.825, sanctioned by Dilma Rousseff, president of the country at the time. The UFC becomes a tutor of the implantation, providing necessary administrative support to the total installation of the new university.

Courses
Undergraduate and postgraduate courses:

See also
Federal University of Ceará

References

External links

 

Federal universities of Brazil
Education in Ceará